Shivaramu Kempaiah (born 15 December 1953) better known by name K. Shivramu, is an Indian actor, politician and former bureaucrat.

Early life and education 
K. Shivramu was born on 6 April 1953. at Uragalli, Ramanagara District. His father was a talented drama master late. S. Kempaiah and mother Chikkaboramma. Having completed his primary schooling in his village, he moved to Bangalore and studied high school at Malleshwaram Government School. During 1972, right after his high schooling, he completed his Typing and Shorthand course both in English and Kannada and got into a government job. In May 1973, he joined the Crime Investigation Department (India) as Police Reporter. While in service, he continued his studies and got Bachelor of Arts degree from V. V. Puram Evening College of Arts & Commerce. He got a Master of Arts (History) Degree through correspondence from the open university of Mysore in the year 1982. In 1985, he cleared K.A.S. exam and was selected as Deputy superintendent of Police. In the year 1986, he secured 1st rank among the Scheduled Caste community in Karnataka Administrative Service exam and got selected as Assistant commissioner of police (India). While he was undergoing training at Karnataka Police Academy, he cleared the civil services exam (UPSC) and was selected for I.A.S. which was his childhood dream. He also holds the distinction of being the 1st person in India to clear the IAS Exam in the Kannada Language.

Political career
In 2013, K. Shivramu joined Indian National Congress after retirement from Bangalore Regional Commissioner.

In 2014, he was a Janata Dal (Secular) member and contested in Bijapur Lok Sabha constituency  and lost the election against Ramesh Jigajinagi.

In 2014, again he rejoined the Indian National Congress in support to get Deputy Chief Minister post to any Dalit leader which led to "a controversy of supporting Dr G. Parameshwar".

On 14 October 2014, he joined Bharatiya Janata Party after failing to recognise a Dalit in a higher place in Indian National Congress politics.

Personal life 
K. Shivramu is married to Vani and has three daughters.

Filmography

References 

Living people
1953 births
Male actors in Kannada cinema
Indian Administrative Service officers
Dalit leaders
Bharatiya Janata Party politicians from Karnataka
Indian National Congress politicians
Janata Dal (Secular) politicians
People from Ramanagara
People from Ramanagara district
Indian National Congress politicians from Karnataka